Ignazio Ferronetti (born 1908) was an Italian film editor and director.  Ferronetti worked as an editor on over thirty films, including a number with Alessandro Blasetti such as the 1934 historical epic 1860. From 1943 he also began directing films, including several documentaries.

Selected filmography

Editor
 The Table of the Poor (1932)
 Palio (1932)
 1860 (1934)
 The Old Guard (1934)
 The Countess of Parma (1936)
 But It's Nothing Serious (1936)
 The Dance of Time (1936)
 Ettore Fieramosca (1938)
 Backstage (1939)
 The Night of Tricks (1939)
 Carmela (1942)
 Souls in Turmoil (1942)
 The Countess of Castiglione (1942)
 Dagli Appennini alle Ande (1943)
 Resurrection (1944)

Director
 The Mysteries of Venice (1951)

References

Bibliography
 Bertellini, Giorgio. The Cinema of Italy. Wallflower Press, 2004.

External links

1908 births
Year of death missing
Italian film editors
Film people from Rome